Mateusz Cieluch (born October 21, 1987 in Siemianowice Śląskie) is a Polish footballer who plays for Ruch Radzionków.

Career
In the summer 2010, he moved to Ruch Radzionków from Podbeskidzie Bielsko-Biała.

References

External links
 

1987 births
Living people
Polish footballers
Odra Opole players
Podbeskidzie Bielsko-Biała players
GKS Katowice players
Jagiellonia Białystok players
Ruch Radzionków players
People from Siemianowice Śląskie
Sportspeople from Silesian Voivodeship
Association football forwards